Lysiosepalum involucratum is a small shrub species in the family Malvaceae.  It is endemic to the south-west of Western Australia. Plants grow to between 0.3 and 1.5 metres high, and produce mauve flowers between August and November in the species' native range.

The species was first formally described as Thomasia involucrata by botanist Nicolai Stepanovitch Turczaninow in 1852 in  Bulletin de la Société Impériale des Naturalistes de Moscou. The species was transferred to the genus Lysiosepalum in 1917 by English botanist George Claridge Druce.

Cultivation
The species prefers a sunny or partially shaded position in well-drained soil. Established plants tolerate dry periods The most common method of propagation is from cuttings of semi-mature new growth. Although plants may be propagated from seed, it is difficult to obtain.

References

involucratum
Malvales of Australia
Rosids of Western Australia
Taxa named by George Claridge Druce
Taxa named by Nikolai Turczaninow
Plants described in 1852